The River Ivel is a north-flowing river in the western part of east of England. It is primarily in Bedfordshire; it is a tributary of the River Great Ouse and has sources including in the Barton Hills.

Course
The river Ivel has four headwaters of equivalent size. By settled convention its name is given frequently to the lower part of the Flit in the south-west and all of its separate south-east headwater which rises in the north of the parish of Baldock in the far north of Hertfordshire. The rest of its course and catchment area is in Bedfordshire. It flows through the parishes of Stotfold, Arlesey, Henlow, Langford, Biggleswade, Sandy and Blunham. It joins the Great Ouse at Tempsford.

Tributaries

The River Hiz joins beside Champneys Henlow, one of four resort hotels.
The Flit joins the Ivel on the western boundary of Langford and its adjoining Ivel Navigation continuation to Shefford, Bedfordshire has meant the lower Flit is frequently labelled in maps as the Ivel.

Areas at flood risk
The watercourse suddenly develops a low gradient. From the Flit confluence to Blunham lakes near its discharge, including parts of the town of Sandy the adjoining land is designated as a Flood Warning Area.  The updated map of which area is, using computer flood-risk models and factors such as latest prevention measures, published by the Environment Agency.

Nature trail

Ivel Navigation
Plans for a canal for the River Ivel were first announced in 1756. Locks were built in 1758 at Tempsford, Blunham, South Mills and Sandy. Tolls were initially lower than advertised leaving construction capital creditors including members of its maintenance committee in debt. Trade increased rapidly and such loans were redeemed in 1780. The canal was extended to Shefford, with locks at Biggleswade, Holme, Stanford and Clifton; reaching Shefford in 1823.

The canal was abandoned in 1876 when a dam was built across it at Sandy, the relevant Private Act of Parliament being passed in the same year.

Industrial heritage structures
A wall of the former wharf at Shefford is beside a bridge over the Flit (tributary).

A maintained towpath adjoins the canalized river. After crossing the footbridge over the River Hit, the path continues straight ahead for some way until the river returns.  The canal, made from the river, used to run immediately to the left of the path, but was filled in after World War II as it was considered dangerous.  The present course of the river there was originally the millstream for Shefford Mill, close to the remains of the tower mill still visible.

Further on, to the east of the village of Stanford a wooden footbridge crosses the river at the site of Stanford Lock, one of the best preserved on the old canal.

Canoeing and punting
The Ivel is no longer navigable to barges and is too narrow in many places along its length for single sculling. It can be canoed with care or punted in good conditions for 11 km between Biggleswade upriver to the junction with the Ouse which can equally be canoed, at Tempsford.

Angling
Its fishing rights are owned by a mixture of:
the default owners, the adjoining landowners who own the river to its mid-point by riparian law (unless expressly varied between them or their predecessors)
by time-limited ownership (lease) or by freehold profit a prendre "in gross" (not tied to any land) in perpetuity by local angling clubs and informal groups of anglers

The Ivel has good condition and large fish when in suitable waters for maturity including barbel (10-17+ lbs), perch (4 lbs+), chub (7 lbs+), roach and carp to 20 lb, and pike.

References

External links
Case study of the River Ivel Walk nr Biggleswade 

Ivel
Ivel
Ivel